ASR-11 is a Digital Airport Surveillance Radar (DASR,) an advanced radar system utilized by the United States as the next generation of terminal air traffic control. The ASR-11 is an upgraded, advanced version of the previous ASR-9 radar. This next generation radar system has been developed through a joint effort by the Federal Aviation Administration, the Department of Defense and the United States Air Force, who took most of the lead development tasks.

Operation 
Much like the previous ASR-9, the ASR-11 has been deployed around airport terminals across the United States to meet the requirements of a digital, automated air traffic monitoring system. The main purpose of the ASR-11 is to replace aging radar systems at airfields that did not receive the ASR-9, as well as use across the world by the United States Military. Many of the advanced parameters such as weather monitoring and digital pinpoint monitoring found on the ASR-9 are also found on the ASR-11. This radar system consists of two separate electronic subsystems, the first being a primary radar and the other, a secondary surveillance radar often referred to as the beacon. Like the ASR-9, the ASR-11 uses a continuously rotating antenna that is mounted on a tower. Transmitted electromagnetic signals reflect off the surface of an aircraft that is within sixty nautical miles of the radar location. The signals are sent to the processing equipment which measures the echo delay, or the amount of time it takes for the electromagnetic signals to return, and the direction from which they came. The information from the signal is sent to an Air Traffic Control tower, or a Radar Approach Control (RAPCON) with a digital tag that describes the location, heading, and speed at which the aircraft is moving. The overall operation of the ASR-11 is similar to that of the ASR-9, with relatively few differences between the two radar systems. There are only two main areas where the ASR-11 has an advantage over the ASR-9, with it also having some disadvantages due to its weather capability.

Advantages 
The first advantage the ASR-11 offers is the use of a low peak-power, solid state transmitter with pulse compression technology, replacing the ASR-9's high peak-power, short pulse power system. This gives the radar the ability to provide the same amount of energy to a target at long range while making the radar less sensitive at shorter ranges. Any aircraft that comes closer than six nautical miles from the radar cannot be located with the long range pulse system built into the ASR-11. Installing additional radar equipment to the same antenna is required for close range location and weather detection. The second advantage of using an ASR-11 is the radar's ability to utilize a pulse sequence diversity. This gives the radar system the capability to limit processing dwells to a small number of pulses. This feature becomes most important when monitoring air traffic is the primary use of the radar. Reducing the number of pulses sent out by the radar system also has a direct effect on the Doppler resolution, resulting in a decreased ability to process live weather conditions.

Disadvantages 
The main disadvantage of using an ASR-11 radar system is the reduction of Doppler Radar Resolution. Like the ASR-9, the ASR-11 has an on-site, dedicated weather reflectivity processor, with six separate levels of precipitation reflectivity. The limited number of pulses sent out by the radar system has a direct effect on its ability to measure weather conditions. Unlike the ASR-9, the ASR-11 is less suited for wind shear detection, Doppler wind measurement, and precipitation reflectivity. The ASR-11 radar system will remain as is, with no further plans to upgrade the current detection system with a Weather Systems Processor (WSP.)

References

Airport infrastructure
Ground radars